Jonas Johansen (born 22 March 1985) is a retired Norwegian footballer who signed for Tromsdalen in 2010, Johansen's strongest position is central defender but can also play in defence midfield and attacking midfield. In his career, he has played for the likes of Tromsø, Haugesund and Kongsvinger.

He took part in the 2006 VIVA World Cup in Occitania, representing Sápmi, who eventually went on to win the tournament.

He is the son of Trond Johansen.

Career statistics

References

External links

1985 births
Living people
Norwegian footballers
Norwegian Sámi people
Norwegian Sámi sportspeople
Eliteserien players
Norwegian First Division players
Norwegian Second Division players
Tromsø IL players
Alta IF players
FK Haugesund players
Kongsvinger IL Toppfotball players
Tromsdalen UIL players
Sportspeople from Tromsø
Association football defenders